Littlest Pet Shop is a 2012 animated television series developed by Tim Cahill and Julie McNally-Cahill. The series is based on Hasbro's Littlest Pet Shop toy line, and features Blythe Baxter (voiced by Ashleigh Ball, with the character based on the doll of the same name) as the main protagonist, as well as other characters who reside in Downtown City, a city modeled after New York City. Along with Blythe is her father, Roger Baxter (voiced by Michael Kopsa), and her employer Mrs. Anna Twombly (voiced by Kathleen Barr) at the nearby pet store, Littlest Pet Shop. Away from home, she maintains several friends at her local high school. As well as the human cast are her seven animal companions, who reside within Littlest Pet Shop during the day, that Blythe unexpectedly gains the ability to communicate with.

The series is produced by Hasbro Studios in the United States and animated by DHX Media's animation studio in Vancouver, British Columbia, Canada. The series is directed by Dallas Parker and Joel Dickie. The series was commissioned by Hasbro Studios in 2011. During production, Blythe Loves the Littlest Pet Shop was used as the working title of the series. The series premiere on Saturday, November 10, 2012 in the United States on Hub Network was reported to have been the highest watched of all original series premieres on the Hub Network. 

On March 31, 2015, it was announced that the series had been renewed for a 26-episode fourth season, but on October 6, 2015, it was confirmed by story editor Roger Eschbacher that the fourth season was going to be the final season. The fourth season aired from November 7, 2015 to June 4, 2016.

Series overview

Episodes

Season 1 (2012–13)

Season 2 (2013–14)

Animated shorts
The day before the start of Season 3, a set consisting of 10 animated shorts started being released online by the Hasbro Studios Shorts YouTube channel. They were written by Julie McNally Cahill & Tim Cahill.

Season 3 (2014–15)
After "The Secret Recipe", which aired on August 23, 2014, Season 3 went into hiatus until December 13, 2014. During that period, the Hub Network has been rebranded as Discovery Family.

Animated shorts 2

Season 4 (2015–16)
On March 31, 2015, Discovery Family announced via press release that the show was renewed for a fourth season. Story editor Roger Eschbacher said that the fourth season will have 26 episodes. On June 4, 2015, Hasbro announced that My Little Pony executive producer Meghan McCarthy will be a story consultant for Littlest Pet Shop. On October 6, 2015, Eschbacher confirmed that the fourth season will be the final season of Littlest Pet Shop. The season premiered with back-to-back episodes beginning on November 7, 2015.

References

Littlest Pet Shop
Littlest Pet Shop
Littlest Pet Shop